Bolitoglossa oresbia is a species of salamander in the family Plethodontidae. It is endemic to Honduras and is known from the summit of Cerro El Zarciadero (its type locality) and the southwestern side of the nearby Cerro Azul Meámbar National Park, in the northern Comayagua Department.

Description
A subadult female measured  SVL. The snout is truncate in dorsal aspect and rounded in profile. The tail is strongly constricted basally. The limbs are relatively slender and long; the digits are moderately webbed. The upper parts are grayish brown or brownish olive with small, inconspicuous, irregularly shaped buff-yellow spots. The ventral surface is uniformly buff-yellow (holotype) or brownish olive with buff-yellow blotches (paratype).

Habitat and conservation
Specimens have been found in water-containing arboreal bromeliads, active on vegetation at night, in a standing, rotten tree trunk about 1 metre above the ground during the daytime, and in moist leaf litter during the morning.

The type locality is a small patch of forest (<1 ha) on a mountain top, completely surrounded by crop fields. Habitat loss may further threaten this population by leading to drying of the environment. Also use of the pesticides in the surrounding area is a potential threat.

References

oresbia
Critically endangered fauna of North America
Endemic fauna of Honduras
Amphibians of Honduras
Amphibians described in 2005
Taxonomy articles created by Polbot